Mokhalefgah (also Romanized as Mokhālefgāh) is a village in Bala Jam Rural District, Nasrabad District, Torbat-e Jam County, Razavi Khorasan Province, Iran. At the 2006 census, its population was 129, in 28 families.

References 

Populated places in Torbat-e Jam County